Shawn Joseph Heins (born December 24, 1973) is a Canadian former professional ice hockey defenceman. He played in the National Hockey League for the San Jose Sharks, Pittsburgh Penguins, and Atlanta Thrashers.

Playing career
Heins was born in Eganville, Ontario. His style of play is that of an offensive defenceman and powerplay specialist. His slapshot, though not well known, has been measured at speeds well over 100 miles per hour. Heins held the record for the hardest recorded shot of all time with the puck going 106 miles per hour, until December 3, 2006. The record was surpassed by Chad Kilger of the Toronto Maple Leafs.

On several occasions, Heins has been a member of Team Canada at the Spengler Cup. In the final stages of the 2012–13 season with Fribourg, Heins suffered a concussion and was unable to re-sign with the club, still suffering post-concussion symptoms months later.

Career statistics

Regular season and playoffs

International

Awards and honors
1999–00 – AHL First All-Star team
2004–05 – DEL Champion
2006–07 – NLA Most Penalized Player (127)
2008–09 – NLA Most Penalized Player (174)
2009 – Spengler Cup All-Star Team

References

External links
 

1973 births
Atlanta Thrashers players
Cape Breton Oilers players
Chicago Wolves players
EHC Basel players
Eisbären Berlin players
Hannover Scorpions players
HC Fribourg-Gottéron players
Ice hockey people from Ontario
Kansas City Blades players
Kentucky Thoroughblades players
Living people
Mobile Mysticks players
People from Renfrew County
Peterborough Petes (ice hockey) players
Pittsburgh Penguins players
San Jose Sharks players
Undrafted National Hockey League players
Windsor Spitfires players
Canadian expatriate ice hockey players in Germany
Canadian expatriate ice hockey players in Switzerland
Canadian ice hockey defencemen